Martin Schwalb (born 4 May 1963) is a former West German handball player who competed in the 1984 Summer Olympics and in the 1996 Summer Olympics. He currently coaches Rhein-Neckar Löwen.

In 2013 he led his team to its first win of the EHF Champions League.

In 1984 he was a member of the West German handball team which won the silver medal. He played all six matches and scored nine goals. He and all the other players of the German Handballteam were awarded with the Silver Laurel Leaf, Germany's highrst sportaward.

Twelve years later he was part of the German team which finished seventh. He played all six matches and scored 23 goals.

Clubs

As a player 

  TSG Steinheim (–1980)
  TSG Oßweil (1980–1982)
  Frisch Auf Göppingen (1982–1984)
  TV Großwallstadt (1984–1988)
  TUSEM Essen (1988–1990)
  SG Wallau-Massenheim (1990–1998)

As a coach 

  SG Wallau-Massenheim (1998–2005)
  HSG Wetzlar (2005)
  HSV Hamburg (2005–2011, 2012–2014)
  Rhein-Neckar Löwen (2020-2021)

References 

 
 

1963 births
Living people
German male handball players
Handball players at the 1984 Summer Olympics
Recipients of the Silver Laurel Leaf
Handball players at the 1996 Summer Olympics
Olympic handball players of West Germany
Olympic handball players of Germany
Olympic medalists in handball
Medalists at the 1984 Summer Olympics
Olympic silver medalists for West Germany
Sportspeople from Stuttgart